Donge may refer to:

Donge local dialect (Language) Dholuo (tribe in Kenya commonly known as Luo) word for Right
Donge (river), river in the Dutch province of North-Brabant
Donge County, in Shandong, China
Donge Constituency, a parliamentary constituency in Zanzibar North Region